The Royal College of Anaesthetists (RCoA) is the professional body responsible for the specialty of anaesthesia throughout the United Kingdom. It sets standards in anaesthesia, critical care, pain management, and for the training of anaesthetists, physicians' assistants (anaesthesia), and practising critical care physicians. It also holds examinations for anaesthetists in training, publishes the British Journal of Anaesthesia, and informs and educates the public about anaesthesia. Its headquarters is in Churchill House, London.

Role
The College’s activities are varied, but include the setting of standards of clinical care, establishing the standards for the training of anaesthetists and those practising critical care and acute and chronic pain management, setting and running examinations, and the continued medical education of all practising anaesthetists.

Publications
The College publishes guidance for its members and the GPAS standards. The College produces the Bulletin magazine a quarterly member magazine.

History
The Royal College of Anaesthetists was awarded its royal charter in 1992, making it one of the youngest Royal Colleges of medicine.  Prior to this time, it had existed as the College of Anaesthetists since 1988, when it split from the Royal College of Surgeons of England. Prior to 1988, it was known as the Faculty of Anaesthetists of the Royal College of Surgeons of England, which was formed in 1948. The roots of the college can be traced back to the Association of Anaesthetists of Great Britain and Ireland (AAGBI), which was set up in 1932 by Henry Featherstone and others, and continues today. The AAGBI derived from the Section of Anaesthetics of the Royal Society of Medicine because that was not allowed to engage in 'political' or 'trade union' activities nor as an examining body.

Coat of arms and motto
The Coat of arms of the College shares some symbols and features with that of the Royal College of Surgeons of England. It also incorporates coca leaves to symbolise local anaesthesia, and opium poppy heads to symbolise sleep (the poppy head is symbolic of the Greek God Hypnos). The figures on either side of the shield (known as "supporters") are two pioneers of anaesthesia, John Snow and Joseph Thomas Clover. The College's motto is “Divinum sedare dolorem”  (it is divine to alleviate pain).

Examinations
 Diploma of Anaesthesia ('DA' - now defunct)
 Fellowship of the Royal College of Anaesthetists (divided into the Primary FRCA and Final FRCA)

Organisation
The College is made up from an elected Council of practising anaesthetists who elect a President and two Vice-Presidents from among their members. Particular areas of work are considered by Committees who report to the Council. As of September 2021, the President is Dr Fiona Donald and the Vice-Presidents are Dr Russell Perkins and Dr Helgi Johannsson. The patron of the Royal College of Anaesthetists is The Princess Royal.

There are six directorates:
 The Chief Executive's Office
 Clinical Quality and Research
 Membership, Media and Development
 Education, Training and Examinations
 Finance and Resources
 People and Operations

Deans and presidents
Deans and presidents of the Faculty, College and Royal College are listed below with terms of office in brackets.

Deans
 Archibald D. Marston CBE (1948 to 1952)
 Bernard Johnson (1952 to 1955)
 Frankis T. Evans (1955 to 1958)
 Sir Geoffrey Organe (1958 to 1961)
 William W. Mushin (1961 to 1964)
 T. Cecil Gray CBE (1964 to 1967)
 W. Derek Wylie (1967 to 1970)
 Cyril F. Scurr CBE (1970 to 1973)
 Gordon Robson CBE (1973 to 1976)
 J. Edmund Riding CBE (1976 to 1979)
 John F. Nunn (1979 to 1982)
 Donald Campbell (1982 to 1985)
 Aileen K Adams CBE (1985 to 1988)

Presidents
 Michael Rosen (1988 to 1991)
 Alastair Spence CBE (1991 to 1994)
 Cedric Prys-Roberts (1994 to 1997)
 Leo Strunin (1997 to 2000)
 Peter Hutton (2000 to 2003)
 Sir Peter Simpson (2003 to 2006)
 Judith Hulf CBE (2006 to 2009)
 Peter Nightingale (2009 to 2012)
 J. P. van Besouw (2012 to 2015)
 Liam Brennan (2015-2018)
 Ravi Mahajan (2018-2021)n
 Fiona Donald (2021-Present)n

References

External links 

 

Anesthesiology organizations
Medical associations based in the United Kingdom
Organisations based in the London Borough of Camden
Organizations established in 1948
Anaesthetists
Anaesthetists
1948 establishments in the United Kingdom